Have You Lost Your Mind Yet? is the fourth studio album by Fantastic Negrito, released through Cooking Vinyl on August 14, 2020. The album won the Grammy Award for Best Contemporary Blues Album.

Critical reception
Have You Lost Your Mind Yet? received a score of 77 out of 100 based on eight reviews at review aggregator Metacritic, indicating "generally favorable" reception.

Track listing

Charts

References

2020 albums
Cooking Vinyl albums
Grammy Award for Best Contemporary Blues Album
Fantastic Negrito albums